Skogmo  may refer to:
Skogmo
Skogmo Chapel
Skogmo (surname)